Ibrahim Kano  (December 12, 1982, Kadiogo) is a Burkinabé professional footballer. He plays for Étoile Filante Ouagadougou.

Career
Kano began his career with Rail Club du Kadiogo, which was later renamed Captain. In summer 2006, he signed with FC Botoşani. The defender played 58 games for FC Botoşani before transferring in summer 2008 to FC Internaţional Curtea de Argeş. After the end of his contract with the Romanian side FC Internaţional Curtea de Argeş, he returned to Burkina Faso and signed with Étoile Filante Ouagadougou.

International career
Kano made his debut for the Burkina Faso national football team on 13 April 2001 against Togo national football team in the Union des Fédérations Ouest Africaines.

Notes

1982 births
Living people
Burkinabé footballers
FC Botoșani players
Liga II players
Expatriate footballers in Romania
Burkinabé expatriate sportspeople in Romania
Rail Club du Kadiogo players
FC Internațional Curtea de Argeș players
Association football defenders
Étoile Filante de Ouagadougou players
People from Centre Region (Burkina Faso)
Burkina Faso international footballers
21st-century Burkinabé people